This list ranks skyscrapers in Cartagena, Colombia by height. This lists ranks Cartagena's skyscrapers that stand at least 150 meters (492 feet) tall, based on standard height measurement. This includes spires and architectural details but does not include antenna masts.

The current tallest building in Cartagena is the Hotel Estelar Bocagrande with 202 meters. 

{| class="wikitable sortable"
|-
! rowspan=2 | Position
! rowspan=2 | Name
! rowspan=2 | Location
! colspan=2 | Height
! rowspan=2 | Floors
! rowspan=2 | Year of completion
|-
! m
! ft
|-
| align=right | 1 || Hotel Estelar Bocagrande || Bocagrande ||  || align=right | 52 || align=right | 2017
|-
| align=right | 2 || Torre Bocagrande Hyatt Regency Cartagena || Bocagrande ||  || align=right | 43|| align=right | 2017
|-
| align="right" | 3 || Allure || Bocagrande ||  
| align="right" | n.a. || align="right" | n.a.
|-
| align="right" | 4 || Grand Bay|| Bocagrande ||  
| align="right" | 42 || align="right" | 2010
|-
| align=right | 5 ||  Portomarine || Bocagrande ||  || align=right | 41 || align=right | 2021
|-
| align="right" | 6 || Nautica || Castillogrande ||  
| align="right" | n.a.|| align="right" | 2019
|-
| align="right" | 7 || Palmetto Sunset || El Laguito||  
| align="right" | 42 || align="right" | 2017
|-
| align="right" | 8 || Ravello|| Castillogrande||  
| align="right" | 38 || align="right" | 2017
|-
| align="right" | 9 || Palmetto || Bocagrande ||  
| align="right" | 39 || align="right" | 2008
|-
| align="right" | 10 || Palmetto Elliptic || Bocagrande ||  
| align="right" | 38|| align="right" | 2012

|}

References 

Buildings and structures in Cartagena, Colombia
Cartagena